

The DRS Sentry HP is a reconnaissance UAV that was developed in the United States in the late 1980s by S-TEC. The program was acquired by Meggitt in 2000 and subsequently by DRS in 2002. Although the aircraft shares the name "Sentry" with a previous S-TEC design, the Sentry HP is a completely different machine, with a broad wing and a V tail. The Sentry HP is larger, with greater payload capacity and an underwing stores capability. It is powered by a variant of the same engine as the Sentry. It can be ordered with an option for fixed landing gear to permit conventional takeoff and recovery.

Specifications

References
This article contains material that originally came from the web article Unmanned Aerial Vehicles by Greg Goebel, which exists in the Public Domain.
 Jane's Unmanned Aerial Vehicles and Targets
 Manufacturer's website

1980s United States military reconnaissance aircraft
Unmanned aerial vehicles of the United States
S-TEC aircraft
V-tail aircraft